Odacanthini is a tribe of ground beetles in the family Carabidae. There are more than 40 genera and 680 described species in Odacanthini.

Genera
These 43 genera belong to the tribe Odacanthini:

 Actenonyx White, 1846
 Aeolodermus Andrewes, 1929
 Anasis Laporte, 1867
 Andrewesia Liebke, 1938
 Arame Andrewes, 1919
 Archicolliuris Liebke, 1931
 Asios Liebke, 1933
 Aulacolius Sloane, 1923
 Basistichus Sloane, 1917
 Clarencia Sloane, 1917
 Colliuris DeGeer, 1774
 Crassacantha Baehr, 1995
 Cryptocolliuris Basilewsky, 1955
 Cyphocoleus Chaudoir, 1877
 Deipyrodes Bousquet, 2002
 Dicraspeda Chaudoir, 1863
 Diplacanthogaster Liebke, 1932
 Dobodura Darlington, 1968
 Erectocolliuris Liebke, 1931
 Eucolliuris Liebke, 1931
 Eudalia Laporte, 1867
 Gestroania Liebke, 1938
 Giachinoana Baehr, 2003
 Homethes Newman, 1842
 Lachnothorax Motschulsky, 1862
 Lasiocera Dejean, 1831
 Mimocolliuris Liebke, 1933
 Myrmecodemus Sloane, 1923
 Neoeudalia Baehr, 2005
 Odacantha Paykull, 1798
 Ophionea Klug, 1821
 Parascopodes Darlington, 1968
 Pentagonica Schmidt-Goebel, 1846
 Polydamasium Liebke, 1938
 Porocara Sloane, 1917
 Protocolliuris Liebke, 1931
 Quammenis Erwin, 2000
 Renneria Baehr, 1999
 Scopodes Erichson, 1842
 Smeringocera Chaudoir, 1863
 Stenidia Brullé, 1834
 Stenocheila Laporte, 1832
 Tricharnhemia Baehr, 2009

References

Lebiinae